The Leytenant Shestakov class consisted of four destroyers built for the Imperial Russian Navy. They were an enlarged derivative of the  destroyers built by the Germany shipyard Friedrich Krupp Germaniawerft. Originally classified as torpedo cruisers, they were redesignated as destroyers on 10 October 1907, prior to completion. The ships served as part of the Black Sea Fleet during the First World War and the Russian Civil War. They are often considered a part of the broader , which included several similar classes of destroyers.

Background 
Originally, the 1903–1923 shipbuilding programme called for additional  destroyers to be built for the Black Sea Fleet. Experience from the Russo-Japanese War showed the need for larger destroyers, and on 21 November 1904 the Naval Technical Committee (Морской технический комитет, MTK) decided to replace the planned ships with four of a larger type. At the time, the only suitable design available was that of the  Vsadnik class ordered from Germaniawerft. Four ships based on a modified version of this design were ordered from the Nikolayev Naval Shipyard.

The design process was prolonged due to numerous changes in requirements as it progressed. Construction of the "enlarged 570 t destroyers" finally began in early 1906. Their names were added to the list of Black Sea Fleet ships on 29 March 1906 and they were officially laid down on 16 September that year.

Design

Propulsion 
A higher speed was hoped for, but, as larger machinery would have come at the cost of increased displacement or reduced range, 25 knots was settled on.

When Leytenant Shestakov began trials in August 1908, she failed to reach the 25 knot design speed. By May 1909, none of the ships had reached 25 knots even after receiving modifications to their propellers and machinery (Kapitan Saken was the fastest at ).

Armament 
The armament of the ships was based on experience in the Russo-Japanese War, which showed that larger guns were needed to defeat enemy destroyers. The secondary armament of six  guns on the Vsadnik class was replaced by four additional  Canet Pattern 1892 for a total of six 75 mm guns; two on the centreline and two on each beam. An unusual design feature carried over from the Vsadniks was the mounting of two guns in sponsons on each side of the forecastle. During construction, replacing the stern 75 mm gun with a  Canet Pattern 1892 was considered and modifications were made to allow this, although the larger guns were not fitted until after the ships had commissioned.

The ships were armed with three  torpedo tubes in single mounts along the centreline, and could carry 40 mines.

Modifications 
In December 1909, the aft 75 mm gun was replaced by a 120 mm gun as planned. The 75 mm guns had their shields removed in December 1910. In 1913–1914, the remaining 75 mm guns were removed, the sponsons eliminated, and a second 120 mm gun mounted on the forecastle. In 1914–1915, the ships received two  anti-aircraft guns, and the number of mines they could carry was increased to 50.

Service 

The four destroyers joined the Black Sea Fleet on 25 November 1909, forming the 2nd Division of the Torpedo Brigade. Modifications continued even after the ships entered active service. In August 1911, the 2nd Division became part of the Black Sea Torpedo Division. With the arrival of the new s in 1914, the ships were moved to the 3rd Division.

After the Ottoman Empire entered the First World War on 29 October 1914, the ships were involved in blockading the Turkish coast, participating in raids and minelaying operations. In early 1916, they helped to cover the Trebizond Offensive. In September 1916, they became part of a special detachment tasked with assisting the Romanian Army in Dobruja.  was sunk on 30 June 1917 after hitting a mine laid by the Ottoman cruiser Midilli near Snake Island, with the loss of 44 men.

Following the October Revolution, the three surviving ships joined the Red Black Sea Fleet on 29 December 1917. Leytenant Shestakov and Kapitan-leytenant Baranov moved from Sevastopol to Novorossiysk on 29 April 1918 ahead of the advancing German forces. Both were scuttled in Tsemes Bay on 18 June 1918 to avoid capture. In December 1927 they were raised by EPRON and scrapped.

Kapitan Saken was placed in storage in Sevastopol in March 1918. On 1 May, she was captured there by German forces and pressed into service on 12 October as R 04. She was taken over by the Allies after the armistice on 24 November and sent to İzmit before joining the Naval Forces of South Russia in October 1919. She participated in the evacuation of Novorossiysk in March 1920. At the end of 1920, she sailed to be interned in Bizerte with the rest of Wrangel's Fleet and was eventually scrapped in France in the early 1930s.

Ships 
All dates given are New Style:

Originally, Kapitan Saken was to be named Leytenant Pushchin (Лейтенант Пущин), but this was changed in March 1907, with another destroyer (formerly Zadorny) receiving the name instead.

Notes

References

Bibliography
 

Destroyer classes
1907 ships
Destroyers of the Imperial Russian Navy
World War I destroyers of Russia
 
Destroyers of the Soviet Navy